Indiana Denchev Vassilev (born February 16, 2001) is an American professional soccer player who plays as a winger for Major League Soccer club St. Louis City SC. He has represented the United States at the under-17, under-18, and under-20 levels. He has played in the English Premier League for Aston Villa, as well as spending time on loan at English Football League sides Cheltenham Town and Burton Albion, winning the 2020–21 League Two title at the former.

Career

Aston Villa
Vassilev started his career with Tormenta FC Academy in Statesboro, Georgia from 2013–2015 before switching to IMG Academy in Florida. He was first scouted by Aston Villa in November 2016 and then again while representing the United States at the 2017 U17 World Cup. He was finally offered a professional contract in 2018. His coach at the IMG Academy, Kevin Hartman, described him as having great leadership qualities and all the attributes he thought were required for him to play at the top level.

Vassilev started playing for Aston Villa's U23 team in the Premier League 2, scoring 4 goals in his first 6 games of the 2019–20 season. He was rewarded with a place in Aston Villa's first team on January 4, 2020, coming off the bench to replace Marvelous Nakamba in an FA Cup tie against Fulham. On January 18, 2020, Vassilev made his Premier League debut, coming on as a substitute in the 67th minute in a 1–1 draw away to Brighton & Hove Albion.

2020–21 season: Burton Albion and Cheltenham Town loans
On September 17, 2020, Vassilev signed for Burton Albion of EFL League One on a season-long loan. He made his Burton debut on September 19, in a 2–1 home victory over Accrington Stanley.

Aston Villa recalled Vassilev from Burton Albion on January 28, 2021. The next day, January 29, he joined League Two side Cheltenham Town on loan until the end of the season. He made his Cheltenham debut on January 30, as a late substitute in a 0–0 away draw against Forest Green. He went on to make 12 appearances for Cheltenham, as they won the League Two title on May 8, 2021 – Vassilev's first trophy in league football.

2021–: Loans to MLS 
On July 7, 2021, Vassilev joined MLS side Inter Miami on loan for the remainder of their 2021 season. Vassilev made his MLS debut as a substitute in a 5–0 defeat to New England Revolution on July 21, 2021. On August 8, 2021, Vassilev scored his first goal in the MLS – an injury time winner against Nashville. Vassilev returned to Aston Villa training in November 2021, after the Inter Miami season had finished.

On May 5, 2022, Vassilev returned to Inter Miami for a second season on loan. Vassilev's contract option was declined by Miami following their 2022 season.

St. Louis City 
On November 12, 2022, Vassilev's MLS rights were acquired by St. Louis City SC as part of the 2022 MLS Expansion Draft. Inter Miami received $50,000 as part of the deal. A permanent transfer for Vassilev to St. Louis City was confirmed by Aston Villa on January 17, 2023 - for an undisclosed fee. 

On February 26, 2023, Vassilev made his debut for St. Louis in their first ever competitive game, a 3–2 MLS victory over Austin.

International career 
Due to his parents' nationality, Vassilev was eligible to represent both the United States and Bulgaria at international level. He represented the United States at the 2017 FIFA Under-17 World Cup and has since made appearances for the United States national under-20 team. At the beginning of 2020, Georgi Dermendzhiev, the Bulgaria national team head coach, stated that Vassilev had politely declined a call up for the Bulgaria under-21 team to continue representing the United States.

Personal life 
Vassilev is of Bulgarian descent. His parents settled in the United States in the early 1990s. His father, grandfather, and great-grandfather all played football in their native Bulgaria.

Career statistics

Club

Honors 
Cheltenham Town
EFL League Two: 2020–21

References

External links

2001 births
Living people
American people of Bulgarian descent
Aston Villa F.C. players
Burton Albion F.C. players
Cheltenham Town F.C. players
Inter Miami CF players
American soccer players
Premier League players
English Football League players
Soccer players from Georgia (U.S. state)
United States men's under-20 international soccer players
American expatriate soccer players
American expatriate sportspeople in England
Expatriate footballers in England
Sportspeople from Savannah, Georgia
Association football forwards
Association football midfielders
Major League Soccer players